Robert John Gannon (January 6, 1959October 3, 2017) was an American politician and businessman from West Bend, Wisconsin.

Early life and education
Gannon was born in Mequon, Wisconsin on January 6, 1959. He graduated from the West Bend High School in West Bend, Wisconsin and attended various colleges and vocational schools.

Career 
He owned Richards Insurance Agency and AmericInn Hotel in West Bend. On November 4, 2014, Gannon was elected to the Wisconsin State Assembly as a Republican.

While discussing a shooting that took place at the East Towne Mall during a town hall meeting in 2015, Gannon criticized gun-free zones and called on concealed carry gun owners to "help clean our society of these scumbags." Representative Chris Taylor denounced his comments as a call "for a vigilante uprising."

In early January 2016, Gannon released a press release tying crime in Milwaukee to the city's economy. After receiving criticism over the press release from Peter Barca, Gannon gave Barca the finger on the floor of the Assembly.

Death
Gannon died of natural causes on October 3, 2017, at the age of 58, leaving a wife and two children.

References

External links

1959 births
2017 deaths
People from Mequon, Wisconsin
People from West Bend, Wisconsin
Businesspeople from Wisconsin
Republican Party members of the Wisconsin State Assembly
21st-century American politicians
20th-century American businesspeople